Olaf Jeglitza (born 15 February 1965), known professionally as O-Jay, is a German rapper best known as the frontman of the '90s Eurodance and pop music project Real McCoy (also known as M.C. Sar & the Real McCoy).

Early life
Jeglitza was born in Berlin, Germany in 1965. After finishing school, he studied at the Lette Foundation, a technical college for photography in Berlin. At age 18, he started working as an independent photographer. After two years, he was hired by an advertising agency as an assistant photographer and became their head of the photo department a year later. Since the age of 15, Jeglitza was involved in the upcoming hip hop movement in Germany.

Music career

1984–88
In 1984, Jeglitza started working with the Berlin-based DJ Frank Hassas (a.k.a. Quickmix) and later started collaborating with the German producer/musician Micky Wolf. During that time, he met the rapper Aram Mouchegh (The-A) and they became a trio act called the Masterplan. In 1987, they released their first single, "We Wanna Be Stars", on the Select record label. The single became a commercial failure. Jeglitza later started to produce the monthly radio show called Freshline Radio and published a German hip hop magazine titled Fresh Beat Magazine.

In 1988, Jeglitza and Hassas together with producer Juergen Wind formed a new project called the Alliance. The first single release, "Action!" was released on their own label Freshline Records. The label sold approximately 20,000 units with the help of their distribution partner 99 Records. This first 12" was followed by more releases, leading them to a first label deal with Rough Trade Records. While "Action!" and the second release "Come into My Life – Rap Version" (The Admirers) ended up being re-released by ZYX Records, the first album of the Alliance (It's Time…) and a couple of other products were released by Rough Trade.

1988–95
1988 saw the birth of the group M.C. Sar & the Real McCoy, in connection with a production request by Reinhard Piel (head of A&R at ZYX Records) for a cover version of the Technotronic hit "Pump up the Jam". The following year, the group signed a new label deal with ZYX Records and made further releases by M.C. Sar & the Real McCoy, such as the song "It's on You". They also created a number of other productions, projects and remixes. Around 1992, the label had financial problems and O-Jay started to work part-time as a photographer again.

In 1993, M.C. Sar & the Real McCoy signed a new deal with the German BMG/Hansa label. The first single, "Another Night" was only a minor hit in Europe, barely making it into the top 100 in several European countries. With the help of Vincent DeGiorgio, the song reached number one in Canada and the act was signed to Arista Records in the U.S. thanks to Arista CEO Clive Davis.

With the upcoming release of "Another Night" in the U.S., the decision was made to change the name M.C. Sar & the Real McCoy, to simply Real McCoy.  The single "Another Night" reached number three on the U.S. Billboard Hot 100 chart, where it had a 40-week run inside the top 40. The single was certified platinum (1,000,000 copies sold), and became the best-selling single by a German artist in the American market.  "Run Away", the follow-up single, entered the top 40 of the Hot 100 Singles chart on 11 March 1995, eventually also reaching number three, and being certified gold (500,000 copies sold) in the US and over 1,500,000 copies sold around the world. The album Another Night was released by Arista in the US on 28 March 1995, and the group won several awards around the world. However, despite what some sources mention, there was no Grammy nomination involved.

1999–present 
In 1999, after the unexpected death of his father, Jeglitza focused on the production of other artists. In 2000, he founded the production service, Blue PM Productions.

In 2001, he produced the German boy band B3 in collaboration with the Berman Brothers and the German-based production company Maxi-Media. This was followed by several other top 20 and top 10 productions.

In 2003, they produced and wrote the hit "Ab in den Süden" performed by their artist Buddy. Shortly after, O-Jay had a heart attack but made a full recovery.

As of 2006, Jeglitza has been working for several national and international labels as a producer, songwriter, publisher and A&R adviser.

Jeglitza represented Poland, with Ich Troje, in the 2006 Eurovision Song Contest.

In 2007, his new label Phears Music was launched, and the Real McCoy single "People Are Still Having Sex", a cover of the song by William David LaTour was released.

In 2009, Jeglitza performed in Canada (July 2009, Z103.5 Summer Rush Halifax and Toronto concerts) and Austria (August 2009, DJ BoBo and Friends concert) as part of the current Real McCoy formation.

Discography

Album appearances

Single appearances

References 

1965 births
Living people
German rappers
Eurovision Song Contest entrants for Poland
Eurovision Song Contest entrants of 2006
Musicians from Berlin